The 21st Annual Grammy Awards were held in 1979, and were broadcast live on American television. They recognized accomplishments by musicians from the year 1978.

Award winners 

Record of the Year
Phil Ramone (producer) & Billy Joel for "Just the Way You Are"
Album of the Year
Broadway Eddie, Richard Finch, Albhy Galuten, K.G. Productions, Ron Kersey,  Arif Mardin, Bobby Martin, Bill Oakes, Freddie Perren, Karl Richardson, William Salter, Thomas J. Valentino (producers), Bee Gees, Ralph MacDonald, David Shire (producers and artists), Don Renaldo (conductor), Yvonne Elliman, K.C. and the Sunshine Band, Kool & the Gang, Walter Murphy, Tavares & Trammps for Saturday Night Fever Soundtrack
Song of the Year
Billy Joel for "Just the Way You Are"
Best New Artist
A Taste of Honey

Children's

Best Recording for Children
Jim Henson (producer) for The Muppet Show performed by The Muppets

Classical

Best Classical Orchestral Performance
Michel Glotz (producer), Herbert von Karajan (conductor) & the Berlin Philharmonic Orchestra for Beethoven: Symphonies (9) (Complete)
Best Classical Vocal Soloist Performance
Luciano Pavarotti for Luciano Pavarotti - Hits From Lincoln Center
Best Opera Recording
George Sponhaltz, John Coveney (producers), Julius Rudel (conductor), Beverly Sills, Alan Titus & the New York City Opera Orchestra for Lehár: The Merry Widow
Best Choral Performance, Classical (other than opera)
Georg Solti (conductor), Margaret Hillis (choir director) & the Chicago Symphony Orchestra & Chorus for Beethoven: Missa Solemnis
Best Classical Performance Instrumental Soloist or Soloists (with orchestra)
Eugene Ormandy (conductor), Vladimir Horowitz & the New York Philharmonic for Rachmaninoff: Con. No. 3 in D Minor for Piano (Horowitz Golden Jubilee)
Best Classical Performance, Instrumental Soloist(s) (without orchestra)
Vladimir Horowitz for The Horowitz Concerts 1977/78
Best Chamber Music Performance
Itzhak Perlman & Vladimir Ashkenazy for Beethoven: Sonatas for Violin and Piano
Best Classical Album
Christopher Bishop (producer), Carlo Maria Giulini (conductor), Itzhak Perlman & the Chicago Symphony Orchestra for Brahms: Concerto For Violin in D

Comedy

Best Comedy Recording
Steve Martin for A Wild and Crazy Guy

Composing and arranging

Best Instrumental Composition
John Williams (composer) for "Theme From Close Encounters of the Third Kind"
Best Album of Original Score Written for a Motion Picture or a Television Special
John Williams (composer) for Close Encounters of the Third Kind
Best Instrumental Arrangement
Quincy Jones & Robert Freedman (arrangers) for "The Wiz Main Title - Overture Part One" performed by various artists
Best Arrangement Accompanying Vocal(s)
Maurice White (arranger) for "Got to Get You Into My Life" performed by Earth, Wind & Fire
Best Arrangement For Voices
Bee Gees (arrangers) for "Stayin' Alive"

Country

Best Country Vocal Performance, Female
Dolly Parton for Here You Come Again
Best Country Vocal Performance, Male
Willie Nelson for "Georgia on My Mind"
Best Country Performance by a Duo or Group with Vocal
Waylon Jennings & Willie Nelson for "Mamas Don't Let Your Babies Grow Up to Be Cowboys"
Best Country Instrumental Performance
Asleep at the Wheel for  "One O'Clock Jump"
Best Country Song
Don Schlitz (songwriter) for "The Gambler" performed by Kenny Rogers

Folk

Best Ethnic or Traditional Recording
Muddy Waters for I'm Ready

Gospel

Best Gospel Performance, Traditional
The Happy Goodman Family for Refreshing
Best Gospel Performance, Contemporary or Inspirational
Larry Hart for "What a Friend"
Best Soul Gospel Performance, Traditional
Mighty Clouds of Joy for Live and Direct
Best Soul Performance, Contemporary
Andrae Crouch for Live in London performed by Andrae Crouch & the Disciples
Best Inspirational Performance
B. J. Thomas for Happy Man

Historical

Best Historical Repackage Album
Michael Brooks (producer) for The Lester Young Story, Vol. 3

Jazz

Best Jazz Instrumental Performance, Soloist
Oscar Peterson for Oscar Peterson Jam - Montreux '77
Best Jazz Instrumental Performance, Group
Chick Corea for Friends
Best Jazz Instrumental Performance, Big Band
Mel Lewis & Thad Jones for Live in Munich
 Best Jazz Vocal Performance
Al Jarreau for All Fly Home

Latin

Best Latin Recording
Tito Puente for Homenaje a Beny More

Musical show

Best Cast Show Album
Thomas Z. Shepard (producer) & various artists for Ain't Misbehavin'

Packaging and notes

Best Album Package
Johnny B. Lee & Tony Lane (art directors) for Boys in the Trees performed by Carly Simon
Best Album Notes
Michael Brooks (notes writer) for A Bing Crosby Collection, Vols. I & II performed by Bing Crosby

Pop

Best Pop Vocal Performance, Female
Anne Murray for "You Needed Me"
Best Pop Vocal Performance, Male
Barry Manilow for "Copacabana (At the Copa)"
Best Pop Vocal Performance by a Duo or Group
The Bee Gees for Saturday Night Fever Soundtrack
Best Pop Instrumental Performance
Chuck Mangione for Children of Sanchez

Production and engineering

Best Engineered Recording, Non-Classical
Al Schmitt & Roger Nichols (engineers) for "FM (No Static at All)" performed by Steely Dan
Best Engineered Recording, Classical
Arthur Kendy, Edward T. Graham, Ray Moore (engineers), Pierre Boulez (conductor)  & the New York Philharmonic for Varese: Ameriques/Arcana/Ionisation (Boulez Conducts Varese)
Producer of the Year
The Bee Gees,  Albhy Galuten & Karl Richardson

R&B

Best R&B Vocal Performance, Female
Donna Summer for "Last Dance"
Best R&B Vocal Performance, Male
George Benson for "On Broadway"
Best R&B Vocal Performance by a Duo, Group or Chorus
Earth, Wind & Fire for All 'n All
Best R&B Instrumental Performance
Earth, Wind & Fire for "Runnin'"
Best Rhythm & Blues Song
Paul Jabara (songwriter) for "Last Dance" performed by Donna Summer

Spoken

Best Spoken Word Recording
Orson Welles for Citizen Kane

References

 021
1979 in California
1979 music awards
1979 in Los Angeles
1979 in American music
Grammy
February 1979 events in the United States